Celebrity Splash! was an Australian reality television series that follows celebrities as they try to master the art of diving. The program premiered on the Seven Network on 29 April 2013 and was hosted by Larry Emdur and Kylie Gillies. The celebrities performed each week in front of a panel of judges and a live audience in an Olympic-size diving pool with the result each week partly determined by home viewers. After poor ratings, the show was moved from its original prime-time slot, with the second semi-final episode shelved. Instead, the show's final aired on 16 May 2013.

The format for the show was a franchise developed by television production company Eyeworks., and was broadcast on SBS 6 as Sterren Springen (Dutch for Celebrities Jump). The British version is known as Splash!.

Cast
The cast was announced on 20 March 2013. Due to injury, Laura Csortan was forced to withdraw from the competition, with Derek Boyer coming in as a last-minute replacement.

Scoring chart

Live show details

Heat 1 (29 April) 

 Judges' vote to save
 Louganis – Paul Fenech
 Camplin – Paul Fenech
 Mitcham – Paul Fenech

Heat 2 (30 April)

References

Seven Network original programming
2013 Australian television series debuts
2013 Australian television series endings
2010s Australian reality television series
English-language television shows
Diving in Australia
Television shows set in Sydney
Australian television series based on Dutch television series